Spicauda tanna, the Tanna longtail, is a species of butterfly in the family Hesperiidae. It is found from Ecuador and French Guiana, north through Central America to Mexico. Rare strays can be found up to the lower Rio Grande Valley in Texas.

The wingspan is 33–38 mm. Adults are on wing from June to December in Mexico and in June in southern Texas.

The larval host is unknown. Adults probably feed on flower nectar.

External links
nearctica

Eudaminae
Butterflies of North America
Butterflies of Central America
Hesperiidae of South America
Lepidoptera of Ecuador
Lepidoptera of French Guiana
Lepidoptera of Venezuela
Fauna of the Amazon
Butterflies described in 1952